Ameroseius reticulatus is a species of mite in the family Ameroseiidae.

References

Ameroseiidae
Articles created by Qbugbot
Animals described in 1905